Clepsis praeclarana is a species of moth of the family Tortricidae. It is found in Russia (Siberia, Volgograd Oblast), Kazakhstan, Georgia, Kyrgyzstan and Mongolia.

The wingspan is 18–23 mm. The forewings are light yellow with a reddish or brownish stripe. Adults have been recorded on wing from June to July.

The larvae feed on Caragana arborescens, Caragana frutex, Caragana bungei and Caragana microphylla.

References

Moths described in 1899
Clepsis